Aches and Pains (first published 1999) is a self-help book by Irish writer Maeve Binchy.

Style
Binchy mixes humour, common sense, and anecdote in her attempt to raise her reader's spirits, while providing "valuable insights into the whole business of being sick". She includes chapters that advise on such topics as "Baring Your Body", "Elastic Stockings", "Giving Up Drink" and "Cheering Things About Chest Pain".

Illustrations
The book is illustrated throughout by Wendy Shea.

Reception
"'With a fine mix of humour and common sense, Maeve Binchy makes light of coping with ailments and hospitals.... Laugh out loud anecdotes delightfully told by Kate Binchy." (CHOICE)

Works by Maeve Binchy
Irish non-fiction books
Self-help books